The Gnathophiurina are a group of Ophiuroidea mostly treated as suborder (but at first as an order Gnathophiurida, and sometimes  as infraorder of Ophiurina or not used at all).

Families
 Amphilepididae Matsumoto, 1915     
 Amphiuridae Ljungman, 1867     
 Ophiactidae Matsumoto, 1915  
 Ophiocomidae Ljungman, 1867   
 Ophionereididae Ljungman, 1867      
 Ophiothricidae Ljungman, 1867

References

 
Ophiurida